Quebec's Government House, known as Spencer Wood, was the viceregal residence of Quebec. It was built in 1854.

History

Originally, the residence of the governor of New France was at the Château St-Louis, in the capital, Quebec City. The monarch's representative continues to work and reside in that city; however, like Ontario, Quebec no longer has an official Government House, after Spencer Wood burned down in 1966. Instead the governor holds an office and a suite of rooms for entertaining near the Parliament Building.

From 1867 to 1881 lieutenant governors of Quebec maintained a separate working office at the Maison Sewell, after which it was moved to the old parliament buildings. Inside are reception rooms, offices and support facilities. The royal suite is the site of swearing-in ceremonies for Cabinet ministers, where royal assent is granted, and where the lieutenant governor receives the premier. Whenever the sovereign or other members of the Royal Family are in the provincial capital, the lieutenant governor resides at a hotel, usually the Château Frontenac.

The history of this park goes back at the very start of the French regime in 1633, when , third governor of New France, occupied it. This estate and several other properties of the governor became one large estate (much larger than today’s park) on 9 April 1657 and was named the châtellenie of Coulonge. It was after his death that the estate was sold to the sisters of the Augustine order the Hôtel-Dieu, and on 12 May 1676, the Quebec Seminary acquired the property.

After the British conquest, the seminary, not having enough funds, sold one of the lots in 1780 to an English officer, Henry Watson Powell, who named this area Powell Place. To create comfortable living quarters, he had a villa, greenhouses and trails built. The park again changed its name in 1811, when Michael Henry Perceval became owner and called it Spencer Wood. However, its splendour today is owed in part to Henry Atkinson, who bought this land in 1833. With his gardener, he created an English-style garden with elms, oaks and trails. Without an owner in 1854, the estate was divided into several sections and the most imposing lot was bought by the government of the Province of Canada to house the governor general.

Six years later, a fire completely destroyed the governor general’s residence. In 1870, Spencer Wood was sold to the province of Quebec and was then home to the lieutenant governor. A few modifications were made throughout the years, namely the fountain that we see today. The Spencer Wood estate was renamed  in 1950. In total, 21 lieutenant governors succeeded each other at this estate and the last one, Paul Comtois, died in the fire which destroyed the house on 21 February 1966, while trying to save the Blessed Sacrament from the private chapel. It was in 1986, after the estate was abandoned, that restoration was undertaken. Finally, the National Capital Commission of Quebec became its owner in 1996.

See also
 Government Houses of Canada
 Government Houses of the British Empire and Commonwealth
 Lieutenant Governor of Quebec

References

External links
 
 
  

Quebec
Houses in Quebec City
Burned buildings and structures in Canada
Rebuilt buildings and structures in Canada
Quebec government buildings
Sillery, Quebec City